De School is a club and an entertainment complex located in western Amsterdam. Founded in 2016, the complex consists of a nightclub, concert venue, restaurant, cafe, gallery space, artist residency, and gym. The club, which occupies a former schoolhouse, is operated by Post CS BV, the company also responsible for the since-closed nightclub Trouw. The club has hosted artists such as DJ Sprinkles, Theo Parrish, Cinnaman, Wata Igarashi, and I-F. De School's nightclub, housed in the former school's bicycle storage room, has a capacity of 700 and has a 24-hour license. The complex additionally serves as the headquarters of Subbacultcha, a local magazine and concert subscription service.
The club was closed in 2020 amidst racism allegations and the COVID-19 pandemic and opened again in September 2022.

References 

Music in Amsterdam
2016 establishments in the Netherlands